Werauhia camptoclada is a plant species in the genus Werauhia. This species is endemic to Costa Rica.

References

camptoclada
Endemic flora of Costa Rica